A Tale of Two Cellos is a recording of twenty-one duets for two cellos and piano (or harp) ranging from the sixteenth century, Monteverdi, to the twenty-first century, Arvo Pärt. The recording features cellists Julian Lloyd Webber and his wife Jiaxin Cheng as well as pianist John Lenehan, harpist Catrin Finch and two former BBC Young Musician of the Year winners Guy Johnston and Laura van der Heijden. It was released by Naxos Records in September 2013.

Track listing

 Camille Saint-Saëns: Ave Maria
 Astor Piazzolla: The Little Beggar Boy (Chiquilin de Bachin)
 Claudio Monteverdi: Interrotte Speranze
 Dmitri Shostakovich: Prelude from The Gadfly
 Gustav Holst: Hymn to the Dawn, Op. 26, No. 1 (arr. for four cellos and harp)
 Roger Quilter: My Lady (Greensleeves)
 Anton Rubinstein: The Angel, Op. 48, No. 1
 Antonín Dvořák: The Harvesters, Op. 38, No. 3
 William Lloyd Webber: Moon Silver
 Robert Schumann: Summer Calm (Sommerruh)
 Giovanni Pergolesi: Dolorosa (Stabat Mater)
 Antonín Dvořák: Autumn Lament, Op. 38, No. 4
 Reynaldo Hahn: If my songs were only wingèd
 Sergei Rachmaninoff: The Waves are Dreaming, Op. 15, No. 2
 Henry Purcell: Lost is my quiet for ever
 Antonín Dvořák: The Modest Lass, Op. 32, No. 8
 Robert Schumann: Evening Star (An den Abendstern) Op. 103, No. 4
 Ethelbert Nevin: O that we two were maying
 Joseph Barnby: Sweet and Low
 Roger Quilter: Summer Sunset
 Arvo Pärt: Estonian Lullaby

Personnel
 Julian Lloyd Webber cello
 Jiaxin Cheng cello
 John Lenehan piano
 Catrin Finch harp
 Guy Johnston cello
 Laura van der Heijden cello

External links 
 Album details, Presto Classical
 A Tale of Two Cellos album reviews, julianlloydwebber.com
 
 

2013 classical albums
Julian Lloyd Webber albums